USS Glacier (AK-183) was an  acquired by the U.S. Navy during the final months of World War II. She served in the Pacific Ocean theatre of operations for a short period of time before being decommissioned and returned to the U.S. Maritime Administration for dispositioning.

Construction
The third ship to be so named by the Navy, Glacier was launched 22 April 1944, under a Maritime Commission contract, MC hull 2114, by Walter Butler Shipbuilding, Inc., Superior, Wisconsin; sponsored by Miss Agnes Kennedy; acquired 29 March 1945, and commissioned 14 April 1945.

Service history

World War II-related service
Following shakedown off Galveston, Texas, Glacier loaded lumber and metal drums at New Orleans, Louisiana, and sailed 18 May 1945 for Pearl Harbor, where she put in 12 June to off-load her cargo.

Underway 29 June with building supplies for Kwajalein, she returned via Eniwetok to San Francisco, California, 5 August. Subsequently, a 5-month voyage out of San Francisco brought general cargo to Pearl Harbor, Tarawa, Majuro, Eniwetok, Guam, and Saipan before Glacier moored at Norfolk, Virginia, 1 February 1946, her missions accomplished.

Post-war decommissioning
Decommissioned there 19 February 1946, she was returned to the Maritime Commission 3 days later and stricken from the Navy List 12 March 1946.

Merchant service
Acquired by the Koninklijke Nederlandsche Stoomboot Mattschappij, N.V., of Amsterdam, Holland, and renamed Ydra, the former Navy cargo ship operated out of Amsterdam, under the Dutch flag, from 1947 to 1962.

She was sold in 1962, to a Saudi Arabian concern, the Saudi Lines, and renamed Asma B, she served commercially from 1962 to 1970 before being sold for scrap in July 1970 at HSINKANG, China.

Honors and awards
Qualified Glacier personnel were eligible for the following:
 American Campaign Medal
 Asiatic-Pacific Campaign Medal
 World War II Victory Medal

Notes 

Citations

Bibliography 

Online resources

External links

 

Alamosa-class cargo ships
Glacier County, Montana
Ships built in Houston
1944 ships
World War II auxiliary ships of the United States